Bruce Lloyd, AM (born 24 February 1937) is an Australian retired politician. He was Deputy Leader of the National Party 1987–93.

Career
He was the President of the Victorian Country Party 1969–71. In the 1971 by-election that followed the resignation of former Prime Minister John McEwen, he was elected to the House of Representatives as the Country Party member for Murray.

On 23 July 1987, he was elected Deputy Leader of the National Party, a position in which he remained until 23 March 1993.  He was the only person to serve as deputy to three Nationals leaders (Ian Sinclair, Charles Blunt and Tim Fischer). He retired in 1996.

References

National Party of Australia members of the Parliament of Australia
Members of the Australian House of Representatives for Murray
Members of the Australian House of Representatives
Members of the Order of Australia
1937 births
Living people
20th-century Australian politicians